Toni Soler i Guasch (born June 4, 1965, Figueres) is a Catalan journalist, television producer and writer.

Career 
With a degree in Contemporary History, he is the creator of the TV show Polònia, on air in Catalan public television channel TV3 since 2006, and currently is the presenter of the daily satirical space Està passant on the same channel since 2017.

He is director of Minoria Absoluta, a content production company responsible for tv shows such as Polònia and Crackòvia on TV3, and other audiovisual products, including several fiction and documentary films.

He is one of the promoters of the Ara newspaper, born in 2010, where he writes regularly. He is also the director of the history magazine El Món d'Ahir.

As a writer, he is the author of a dozen of books in various genres.

His programs have received several awards, including three Ondas awards, the City of Barcelona Award (2005) and the Catalan National Prize for Communication (2008).

Private life 
His sister is the writer Sílvia Soler.

Published works 
Works published in Catalan language:

Non-fiction 

 1994: Pretèrit Imperfecte
 1996: Roca, l'últim segon (with Andreu Farràs)
 1998: Badalona davant del mirall
 2005: La Penya en 75 paraules
 2008: Amb llengua o sense
 2009: L'última carta de Companys

Narrative 

 1996: Els mals moments
 1997: Diccionari poc útil
 1998: Història de Catalunya (modèstia a part)
 2003: Vota'm inútil
 2003: Objectiu la pau: 34 dies inoblidables
 2011: 14 d'abril. Macià contra Companys
 2018: El tumor (Anagrama) ISBN 978-84-339-1566-5
 2020: Un bon cel (La Campana)

References 

Writers from Catalonia
Television presenters
People from Figueres
Catalan-language writers
1965 births
Living people